The Bombardment of Samsun was a naval operation carried out by the Greek Navy and the United States Navy against the Turkish town of Samsun in 1922. The ships fired 400 rounds at the town, and in return the single Turkish cannon in the town fired back 25 rounds. The bombardment lasted almost three hours (15:02–18:00).

Causes

There were several reasons for the bombardment. One of them was to assist Pontic Greek rebels who were fighting Turkish forces in the area. Another reason was to disrupt the consignment of weapons and ammunition into inner Anatolia. Moreover, Turkish sailing boats were seizing Greek ships in the Black Sea and putting them into Turkish service. Recently a large Greek ship named Enosis had been taken over by one Turkish officer and five soldiers on 25 April 1922.

Outcome
In the end, the attack did not cause any damage to the Turkish logistical system or military material, though it caused damage to civilian properties and loss of civilian lives. The ships stayed in Samsun until being recalled to Allied-controlled Constantinople. Around 8pm, US Navy Admiral Robert L. Ghormley went ashore, accompanied by a pharmacist, to see if any Americans were injured or dead.

The New York Times reported the incident on 11 June 1922, stating that the Greeks claimed the firing was directed against the ammunition dumps. The newspaper further mentioned that few people died and the warehouse of the American Tobacco Company was slightly damaged. The Times published another article about the incident on 12 June. The article said that the commander of an American torpedo boat destroyer at Samsun reported, contrary to the Greek report, that there were 90 casualties as a result of the bombardment and a portion of the town was destroyed. The ammunition depots belonging to the Turks, which were situated three miles inland, were not damaged.

Civilian properties damaged or destroyed by the bombardment included:

 the governor's office destroyed
 the house of the Greek priest partially damaged
 three houses belonging to local Greeks destroyed
 one shop (Alston) partially damaged
 one shop belonging to a Greek destroyed (worth 30,000 liras)
 25-26 houses belonging to Turks destroyed
 19 houses belonging to Turks damaged
 19 barges damaged (cost of repairs worth 1,500 liras)
 Armenian church and its orphanage damaged
 one sentry house destroyed
 a depot belonging to the local merchants destroyed
 gasoline and kerosene in the petroleum depot belonging to the municipality burned, with the following containers of fuel listed:
 9,496 tinplate containers of American kerosene
 19,800 tinplate containers of Russian kerosene
 41,700 tinplate containers of kerosene,
 6,000 kg of Russian gasoline
 33,000 kg of gasoline belonging to the municipality
 8,368 kg of mercantile gasoline

As a result of the bombardment, there were four dead and three wounded among the civilians.

External links 
Samsun′u Bombalayan Yunan Zırhlısı, tarihtendersler.com; Article about the bombardment of Samsun.

Bibliography
Hulki Cevizoğlu, 1919'un Şifresi (Gizli ABD İşgalinin Belge ve Fotoğrafları), Ceviz Kabuğu Yayınları, Aralık 2007, . 
Doğanay, Rahmi; İstiklal Harbinde Samsun’daki Amerikan Filosu, Geçmişten Geleceğe Samsun, Samsun 2006, (pages 163-174).

References

Samsun
Samsun
Samsun
Samsun
History of Samsun Province
1922 in the Ottoman Empire
1922 in Greece
1922 in the United States
June 1922 events
United States Navy in the 20th century